Berkeley Moir (1912 – 27 November 2006) was a British architect. His work was part of the architecture event in the art competition at the 1948 Summer Olympics.

References

1912 births
2006 deaths
20th-century British architects
Olympic competitors in art competitions
People from Congleton
Royal Navy officers of World War II